Martin Yates (born 1 July 1958, London) is a British conductor. After attending Kimbolton School (1969–1974), he studied at the Royal College of Music and Trinity College of Music, London, where his teachers included Bernard Keeffe (conducting), Richard Arnell (composition), Ian Lake, Jakob Kaletsky and Alan Rowlands (piano), and Douglas Moore and John Burden (French horn).

Conductor

He made his conducting debut in 1983 with Israel National Opera in Carmen, and appeared with them as guest conductor for two seasons, where he conducted Tosca, Madama Butterfly, La bohème and La traviata.  He came to UK notice making his Edinburgh Festival debut in 1988 with Leonard Bernstein's On The Town, and thereafter conducted several major London musicals, including The Phantom of the Opera (Her Majesty's Theatre), Miss Saigon (Theatre Royal, Drury Lane), Carousel (Shaftesbury Theatre) and Sunset Boulevard (Adelphi Theatre). In 1995 he crossed back to mainstream classical music and has since appeared regularly at several major opera houses including Paris, Vienna, Dresden, Helsinki, Stockholm, Oslo, Rome, Tokyo and the Royal Opera House, Covent Garden.

He conducts many major symphony orchestras, including the Staatskapelle Dresden, Gothenburg Symphony, Swedish Chamber Orchestra, Royal Scottish National Orchestra, Tonhalle Orchestra, Royal Stockholm Philharmonic, Royal Liverpool Philharmonic, City of Birmingham Symphony Orchestra, and the Royal Philharmonic Orchestra. He is a regular conductor of the BBC Concert Orchestra (conducting the Proms in the Park in London for three years running) and has made notable recordings of composer Richard Arnell's work as well as recordings by other neglected British composers. For three years running he conducted the Nobel Peace Prize Concert in Oslo, and he regularly conducts the Royal Ballet, both at Covent Garden and on their international tours.

From 1994 to 1999, he was the principal conductor of the National Symphony Orchestra in London and since 2010 he has been the principal conductor of the Symphony Orchestra of the Cambridge University Music Society.

Martin Yates has made over 100 recordings, including (for Dutton Epoch) the world premier recordings of the complete symphonies, ballets and concertos of Richard Arnell, John Joubert's Symphony 2; Symphonies 3 & 4, Sinfonietta 1 & Piano Concerto 2 by Stanley Bate, Thomas Dunhill (Symphony in A), Erik Chisholm (Symphony No. 2), Peter Crossley-Holland (Symphony in D), String Orchestra music by Arnold Bax, Stephen Dodgson and Richard Arnell, Orchestral Songs by John Ireland, Arnold Bax and others, also Piano Concertos (with pianist Victor Sangiorgio) by Stanley Bate, Benjamin Godard and Franz Reizenstein and with pianist Peter Donohoe piano concertos by Malcolm Arnold, Alan Bush and Cyril Scott and with pianist Martin Roscoe the complete piano and orchestra works by Charles-Marie Widor. 

He has conducted several recordings of music by Ralph Vaughan Williams including Symphony 5, Concerto for Two Pianos, premier recordings of Serenade for small orchestra, Bucolic Suite, The Blue Bird & The Fat Knight, the entire score of Scott of the Antarctic and the first modern recording of A London Symphony in its second version (1920). During the 1990s he made many recordings of complete musicals for TER, including Brigadoon, The Phantom of the Opera, Jesus Christ Superstar, Sweet Charity, Stop the World I Want to Get Off, The Fantasticks and Seven Brides for Seven Brothers. He conducted the highly regarded Royal National Theatre production of Carousel in London's west end and made the London cast recording.

Composer
As a composer his music for flute and piano has been recorded by flautist Anna Noakes. His flute sonata is subtitled Fire Island, but this is to be taken metaphysically and is not a reference to the New York State island. 

In 2015, he was commissioned by the Royal Ballet to write the score for Elizabeth, a ballet by Will Tuckett to a text by Alasdair Middleton. He wrote a musical with Dudley Stevens (The Soap Opera, 1986), seen briefly at the Piccadilly Theatre, London and another musical with Steve Devereaux (Wuthering Heights).

Orchestrator
In 2010, he completed and orchestrated Ernest John Moeran's Symphony No.2 (from sketches), which he recorded with the RSNO on Dutton Epoch in 2011. This recording was awarded Recording of the Year by Musicweb International. The first public performance of the Symphony was given by Yates and the BBC Concert Orchestra at the English Music Festival in June 2012. A subsequent performance took place with Yates conducting the Brighton Philharmonic Orchestra in December 2012. 

Yates completed Edward Elgar's Pageant of Empire, recorded by Yates conducting baritone Roderick Williams, and realised and completed Richard Arnell's Symphony No.7 (Mandela), recorded by Yates and the RSNO. His orchestration of Sarnia – an Island Sequence for Orchestra by John Ireland has recently been recorded by the RSNO and released on Dutton Epoch. 

In 2015, he completed and orchestrated Fantasia for Orchestra, the unfinished work by George Butterworth and gave the world premier with the BBC Concert Orchestra at the 2015 English Music Festival. His subsequent completions and orchestrations include Ralph Vaughan Williams The Fat Knight, The Blue Bird, Christmas Overture and the Little March Suite and Edward Elgar The Spanish Lady Symphonic Suite. His orchestration for the Kenneth MacMillan Ballet Manon was made for the Royal Ballet in 2011 and is now used throughout the world and his orchestration of the Carlos Acosta Ballet Don Quixote was made for the Royal Ballet and premiered in September 2013. 

In 2015, he orchestrated and arranged two ballet versions of Carmen; one in three acts for Liam Scarlett for Norwegian National Ballet and one in one act for Carlos Acosta for the Royal Ballet. For Liam Scarlett he has also arranged and orchestrated The Queen of Spades (Tchaikovsky) for the Royal Danish Ballet in 2018 and Dangerous Liaisons (Saint-Saens) for the Queensland Ballet in 2019. 

In 2012, he completed the early Piano Concerto and completed and revised the early Cello Concerto both by Cyril Scott. He recorded these for Dutton Epoch with Peter Donohoe (piano) and Raphael Wallfisch (cello) with the BBC.

References

External links
 Martin Yates artist management
 Martin Yates Scandinavian management
 Cambridge University Symphony Orchestra

British male conductors (music)
1958 births
Living people
People educated at Kimbolton School
Alumni of the Royal College of Music
Alumni of Trinity College of Music
British composers
Musicians from London
Musicians from Cambridgeshire
21st-century British conductors (music)
21st-century British male musicians